Pang! is the sixth studio album by Welsh musician Gruff Rhys. It was released on 13 September 2019 under Rough Trade Records.

Critical reception
Pang! was met with generally favorable reviews from critics. At Metacritic, which assigns a weighted average rating out of 100 to reviews from mainstream publications, this release received an average score of 80, based on 12 reviews.

Track listing

Charts

References

2019 albums
Gruff Rhys albums
Rough Trade Records albums